Rainer Adrion (born 10 December 1953) is a German football manager and former defender.

Coaching career

Adrion was head coach of SpVgg Unterhaching on two occasions. The first stint was from July 1991 to May 1993 and the second stint was from September 2001 to April 2002. Adrion went on to be the head coach at VfB Stuttgart II; managing them on three occasions. The first stint started in January 1996. He was their head coach for them until he became head coach of the first team in December 1998. The third stint happened from June 2004 to June 2009 when he became the new head coach for the Germany U21 team. Then Adrion was head coach of VfB Stuttgart from December 1998 to May 1999. Adrion was winless in his last eight matches. He had two wins during his tenure. After his second spell at Unterhaching, Adrion became head coach at Stuttgarter Kickers from March 2003 to October 2003. Adrion became the new head coach for the Germany U21 team in June 2009. He was sacked in June 2013 after failing to get out of the group stage of the European Championship.

Coaching record

Personal
Adrin has two sons, Benjamin is a former footballer, currently journalist of the Magazin "VIVA St. Pauli" and his second son Nico is also professional footballer.

References

External links
 

1953 births
Living people
Footballers from Stuttgart
German footballers
VfB Stuttgart II players
VfB Stuttgart players
SpVgg Unterhaching players
TSV 1860 Munich players
Bundesliga players
German football managers
VfB Stuttgart managers
Stuttgarter Kickers managers
Bundesliga managers
SpVgg Unterhaching managers
SpVgg Ludwigsburg players
3. Liga managers
Association football defenders
Germany national under-21 football team managers
VfB Stuttgart II managers